Bethnal Green and Bow is a constituency in Greater London, represented in the House of Commons of the UK Parliament since 2010 by Rushanara Ali of the Labour Party.

Boundaries

Since the 2014 boundary changes, the constituency has contained the following electoral wards: 
 Weavers, Spitalfields and Banglatown, Whitechapel, St. Peter's, Bethnal Green, Stepney Green, St. Dunstan's, Bow West, Bow East.

History of boundaries
The 1974–83 constituency comprised the then London Borough of Tower Hamlets wards of Bethnal Green Central, Bethnal Green East, Bethnal Green North, Bethnal Green South, Bethnal Green West, Bow North, Bow South, Bromley, Holy Trinity and Spitalfields.

Between the 1983 and 1997 general elections, the equivalent seat was Bethnal Green and Stepney.

The Tower Hamlets wards of Blackwall and Cubitt Town, Bromley-by-Bow, East India and Lansbury, Limehouse, Mile End East, Millwall, St Katherine's and Wapping and Shadwell were before 2010 under the national Boundary Commission for England review which identified a need for London representation changes based on electorate estimates moved to the new constituency of Poplar and Limehouse. In this review a name change to "Tower Hamlets North" was publicly consulted on and rejected.

From 2010 to 2014 the seat had electoral wards:
Bethnal Green North, Bethnal Green South, Bow East, Bow West, Mile End and Globe Town, St Dunstan's and Stepney Green, Spitalfields including Brick Lane, Weavers, and Whitechapel in the London Borough of Tower Hamlets*

Constituency profile

The seat is centred on the northern part of the London Borough of Tower Hamlets, taking in much of Bethnal Green, Cambridge Heath, Whitechapel, Shadwell, Spitalfields  and Stepney, most of Bow, and parts of Shoreditch, Limehouse and Hackney. It includes much of the traditional East End and Brick Lane. The seat has a large Muslim community – one of the largest proportion of Muslim voters in the country. Whereas the seat has many small conservation areas, it measures overall as among the poorest by income in London and is one of the most ethnically diverse, there is no majority ethnic group — large ethnic groups are British Bangladeshi, White British, other White European and Black British.

Workless claimants who were registered jobseekers were in November 2012 higher than the national average of 3.8%, at 6% of the population based on a statistical compilation by The Guardian.

History

Political history
Bethnal Green and Bow is, based on results in local and national elections, traditionally a very safe Labour seat, its predecessor seats being held by Labour since prior to World War II. However, the 2005 Respect victory in this constituency bucked that trend when the electorate voted for expelled Labour MP, George Galloway, generally considered to be far-left, who mounted a campaign focussed on two seats (see Poplar and Shoreditch and see, as to council representation, the London Borough of Tower Hamlets).

1970s–1994
In 1974 the Bethnal Green constituency was abolished. A new seat was created with the strict official name of Tower Hamlets, Bethnal Green and Bow. However the London Borough prefix is not commonly used for seats in the 1974–1983 redistribution.

The 1974–1983 constituency was a safe Labour seat, with the Liberal Party in a distant second place. Ian Mikardo, a well known back bench Labour MP, represented the area in this period.

Between 1983 and 1997, most of the present constituency formed the seat of Bethnal Green and Stepney.

The borough of Tower Hamlets has a reputation for being a bastion of radical politics, historically with a minority of Communists on its council and more recently with Respect forming the largest opponents to the quite frequent large Labour majorities on the council level.  Before a recent revival, the Conservative Party were absent from the council from 1931 until 2006 – and all of its  revival has been in the two riverside wards which does not apply to any of this seat. The Liberal Party remained the main challengers to Labour in the Bethnal Green area but the loss of Percy Harris as Bethnal Green South West MP and eventually as London County Councillor too (despite a temporary comeback in 1946) put them out of the running in Parliamentary elections until a Liberal revival began in Bow in the late 1970s. Tower Hamlets was the only London Borough to have had seats held by the Communist Party of Great Britain; they lost their last seats in 1971. Between 1945 and 1950, Mile End provided the CPGB with one of its two parliamentary seats, being represented by Phil Piratin. Two Communists also won seats on the London County council (LCC) in 1947.

Between 1986 and 1994, the Liberal Democrats controlled Tower Hamlets London Borough Council, this proved a successful but controversial period. The delivery of major infrastructure projects, including many schools and school housing projects, was balanced by alleged corruption.

1997–2010
At the 1997 general election, there was a swing of 5% to the Conservative Party at a time when the national trend was a landslide swing against them. Bethnal Green and Bow was one of only two Labour-held constituencies to have any sort of pro-Conservative swing. Broadsheets and local newspapers ascribed this unusual result to problems over the selection of a Labour candidate, following the retirement of Peter Shore. Oona King, who won the selection, was not well known and many in the local area would have preferred a candidate from a Bangladeshi background. However the leading Bangladeshi candidates in the local Labour Party were excluded from the selection. The only other constituency to have a pro-Conservative swing was Bradford West, who similarly had selected a Sikh rather than a Muslim candidate.

Following British participation in the 2003 invasion of Iraq, an action deeply unpopular with the Muslim community in the constituency but nevertheless supported by King, the newly formed Respect Party gained support. They topped the poll in Tower Hamlets in the 2004 European Parliamentary elections and subsequently won their first local council seat at a by-election. In the 2005 general election, the seat was a narrow victory for ex-Labour MP George Galloway, one of Respect's leading figures. Respect also won seats at the 2006 local council elections although its performance was not as strong as many observers believed it could have been.

Galloway attracted criticism for lack of attendance at Parliament, especially when he appeared on Celebrity Big Brother. He said that he had not missed any crucial votes, and that the best way for him to advance the interests of his constituents was by general campaigning. Galloway had always said that he only intended to stay in the seat for one parliament, and in 2010 stood for the neighbouring constituency of Poplar and Limehouse. However, he lost to the Labour incumbent Jim Fitzpatrick.

2010 general election
In September 2007, the Respect Party selected Abjol Miah, the leader of the Respect Group on Tower Hamlets Council, as their candidate to replace George Galloway in Bethnal Green and Bow. Miah had worked in the local area as a radio presenter, drugs worker and martial arts trainer. The Labour Party selected Rushanara Ali, an Oxford graduate and then-charity worker for the Young Foundation who had previously worked as Parliamentary Assistant to the constituency's former Labour MP, Oona King. Ajmal Masroor, a television presenter on political debates and an imam, was the Liberal Democrat candidate. Zakir Khan was selected by the Conservative Party from an open primary. He was the head of Public Affairs for the Canary Wharf Group based in Tower Hamlets, and a former sports manager.

The election result was a clear win for Labour, this constituency being one of only three that Labour had gained at the 2010 general election, and represented a major setback for Respect (which thereby lost its sole seat in Parliament). Ali won with 21,784 votes (42.9%, up 8.4% for Labour); Masroor came in second with 10,210 (20.1%, up 7.8% for the Liberal Democrats); Miah received 8,532 votes, 16.8% of the total, representing a 19.8% fall in the Respect vote; and Khan received 7,071 (13.9%, a 2.0% increase in the Conservative vote). However, George Galloway did not contest re-election as MP for Bethnal Green and Bow, instead contesting Poplar and Limehouse. He finished in third place there, behind the Conservatives and Labour; but went on to win the Bradford West constituency at a by-election held on 29 March 2012.

Members of Parliament

Election results

Elections in the 2010s

Elections in the 2000s

Elections in the 1990s

Elections in the 1970s

Demography
The 2011 census recorded a population of 125,351 people.  The constituency has recently become one of the most ethnically diverse areas in the UK, 3.11% of the population were of mixed race, the largest non-mixed ethnic group was white at 41.9 per cent of the population (and of the total: 33.6% of British ethnicity), the second largest ethnic group was Bangladeshi which formed 33.4 per cent of the population, other Asians 6.59 per cent (comprises British Indians, British Pakistanis and other Asians), those of Black race constituted 4.9 per cent (see British African-Caribbean community), Chinese 1.81 per cent, and other ethnic groups, including Arab heritage 2.24 per cent.  Statistics from the census recorded 35.4 per cent of people are Muslims, among the highest ten seats by Muslim proportion of the population in the UK.

In 2001 the largest two groups were in the same order, but constituted 46.4% and 35.7% of the population, respectively.

Notes

References

External links
UK Constituency Maps
BBC Vote 2001 (Includes 1997 and 2001 results)
BBC Election 2005 (Includes 2005 candidates)
Politics Resources (Election results from 1922 onwards)
Electoral Calculus (Election results from 1955 onwards)

Bibliography
 Boundaries of Parliamentary Constituencies 1885–1972, compiled and edited by F.W.S. Craig (Parliamentary Reference Publications 1972)
 British Parliamentary Election Results 1974–1983, compiled and edited by F.W.S. Craig (Parliamentary Research Services 1984)
 Who's Who of British Members of Parliament, Volume IV 1945–1979, edited by M. Stenton and S. Lees (Harvester Press 1981)

Parliamentary constituencies in London
Politics of the London Borough of Tower Hamlets
Constituencies of the Parliament of the United Kingdom established in 1974
Constituencies of the Parliament of the United Kingdom disestablished in 1983
Constituencies of the Parliament of the United Kingdom established in 1997
Bethnal Green
Bow, London